Stewart Judah (February 16, 1893 – June 11, 1966) began a career in magic in 1920. By 1938 he was selected as one of the 10 best living card magicians.

Named one of the "Card Stars" in Hilliard's Greater Magic and featured in Pallbearer's Review. He contributed effects to many magazines including Jinx, Phoenix, New Phoenix, Talisman and Linking Ring.

One of his marketed effects was the "Keys of Judah".

Each year, International Brotherhood of Magicians Ring 71 holds a yearly picnic combined with the local Society of American Magicians, featuring the time-honored John Braun/Stewart Judah contest.

Published works
 Subtle Problems You Will Do (1937) with John Braun
 The Magic World of Stewart Judah (1966) edited by John Braun

Tributes to Stewart Judah
A Tribute To The Card Tricks Of Stewart Judah by Ryan Swigert (2007)

See also
List of magicians

References

External links

Cincinnati International Brotherhood of Magicians Ring 71

American magicians
1893 births
1966 deaths
Sleight of hand
Card magic
Place of death missing
People from Cincinnati